Stephen Decatur High School may refer:
Stephen Decatur High School (Decatur, Illinois)
Stephen Decatur High School (Maryland) in Berlin, Maryland

See also
Stephen Decatur Middle School, Clinton, Maryland